The Dry Range,  el. , is a small mountain range northwest of White Sulphur Springs, Montana in Meagher County, Montana.

See also
 List of mountain ranges in Montana

Notes

Mountain ranges of Montana
Landforms of Meagher County, Montana